Natural Ice Cream, d/b/a Naturals, is an Indian ice cream brand owned by Mangalore-based Kamaths Ourtimes Ice Creams Pvt. Ltd. It was founded by Raghunandan Srinivas Kamath who opened its first store at Juhu in Mumbai in 1984.

The chain recorded a retail turnover of 300 crore in the financial year 2020, up from 115 crores in 2015. The ice creams are manufactured by Kamaths Ourtimes Ice Creams and retailed by its subsidiary company Kamaths Natural Retail Pvt. Ltd.

The 2017 rebranding effort, which established the ‘Taste the Original’ tagline, was aimed at setting it apart from similar named brands popping up.

Market
As of April 2022, the chain has 18 directly-owned stores and 119 franchised stores across 11 states. The stores are present in the states of Maharashtra, West Bengal, Karnataka, Goa, Telangana, Kerala, Madhya Pradesh, Chhattisgarh, Gujarat, Rajasthan and Delhi NCR.

Production and trade
The brand's only production facility is situated in Charkop, a suburb of Kandivali in Mumbai, India. The company supplies to its own stores every day. The company spends less than 1% of its sales revenues on advertising, relying mainly on word of mouth to attain revenues.

On completing two years, the brand launched an experiential concept store in Juhu named Naturals Now, which serves freshly churned ice cream straight out of the churner.

Products
Starting with around 10 flavours, today Natural Ice Cream has 125 flavour options, of which 20 are offered throughout the year. The set of flavours change according to seasons. Some of the seasonal flavors include litchi, fig, jackfruit, Muskmelon and watermelon. A custard apple flavor is also purveyed by the brand.

Awards and recognition
In 2006, the brand received Corporation Bank's National SME's Excellence Award in the Food and Agro Industry. In February 2009, a Natural Ice Cream store located in the Juhu Ville Parle Development scheme placed in the Limca Book of Records for the largest ice cream slab, which weighed 3,000 kilograms. The brand was awarded as Best in Customer Service - Regional Retailer Of the Year in 2013. In 2014 the brand received the gold medal for most innovative ice cream flavour (cucumber) in the Great Indian Ice Cream Contest. In 2016, Natural Ice Cream was awarded for home grown concept in food service by Coca-Cola Golden Spoon Awards and also received IMAGES Most Admired Food Service Chain of the Year in the Ice-cream & Dessert Parlours category. It was named as India’s Top 10 brand for customer experience in a KPMG survey.

See also

 List of ice cream brands

References

External links
 

Ice cream brands
Restaurant chains in India
Companies based in Mumbai
1984 establishments in Maharashtra
Frozen food
Brand name frozen desserts
Frozen food brands